Johnny Kroon (born 6 January 1960) is a Swedish former middle-distance runner who specialised in the 1500 metres. He represented his country at the 1987 World Championships. He held the national record in the 1500 metres between 1985 and 2019.

His son, Simon Kroon, is a footballer.

International competitions

Personal bests
Outdoor
800 metres – 1:47.58 (Västerås 1987)
1000 metres – 2:19.58 (Oslo 1981)
1500 metres – 3:36.49 (Oslo 1985)
One mile – 3:55.17 (Berlin 1986)
3000 metres – 8:19.24 (Bydgoszcz 1979)
Indoor
1500 metres – 3:41.26 (Stuttgart 1987)

References

All-Athletics profile

1960 births
Living people
Swedish male middle-distance runners
World Athletics Championships athletes for Sweden